Denys Lombard (1938 – January 8, 1998) was a leading Asian expert with contributions to Southeast Asian studies, Sinology, and the history of maritime Asia. He was famous for efforts to compare insular Southeast Asia and the Asian Seas to the Mediterranean area.

Early life and education
Lombard was born in Marseilles, France. His father was Maurice Lombard, Director of Studies at the École Pratique des Hautes Études (EPHE) in Paris and colleague of Fernand Braudel.

Lombard possessed at least six academic degrees, including a graduate degree in history and four degrees in languages (Chinese, Malay-Indonesian, Cambodian and Thai). He spoke over a dozen languages.

Career
Lombard was the head of the Division des Aires Culturelles in the École des Hautes Études en Sciences Sociales (EHESS) and the director of the École Français d'Extrême-Orient (EFEO) from 1993 to 1998.

His major work on Indonesia was the three volume work Le carrefour javanais.

Personal life
Lombard was married to another scholar of Asia, Claudine Salmon.

He died in 1998 in Paris.  A Festschrift in honour was produced a year later.

Publications 
 
 , Third Edition: - 
 
 
 Le carrefour javanais. Essai d'histoire globale [The Javanese Crossroads: Towards a Global History]. By Denys Lombard. Three volumes. Paris: Éditions de l'École des Hautes Études en Sciences Sociales, 1990.

References

1938 births
1998 deaths
Historians of Southeast Asia
20th-century French historians
Indonesianists